This is list of Star class sailors at the Summer Olympics.

1932 Los Angeles

1936 Berlin

1948 London

1952 Helsinki

1956 Melbourne

1960 Rome

1964 Tokyo

1968 Mexico City

1972 Kiel

1980 Moscow

1984 Los Angeles

1988 Seoul

1992 Barcelona

1996 Atlanta

2000 Sydney

2004 Athens

2008 Beijing

2012 London

 
Star class, Olympic 
Sailors, Star class